The Battle of Rakshasbhuvan in India was fought on 10 August 1763. After the defeat of the Marathas at the Battle of Panipat, their rivals started seizing the opportunity to recover their losses in the past at the hands of Marathas. Particularly, the Nizam of Hyderabad wanted to recover territory he had lost at the Battle of Udgir where all of his dukes and earls were killed. He decided to launch a war on the Marathas.

Battle
To boost the morale of his army, on the advice of his Diwan Vithal Sundar Pratapwant, the son of Sundar Narayan, who had renovated the Kala Ram temple at Nasik (Historian Ninad Bedekar mentions Vithal Sundars surname as "Parshurami") he declared Inams and Jagirs to many warriors who had deserted the Marathas and had joined with him to replace his warriors who were killed at Udgir. The main warrior amongst them was Vinayak Dasrao, nephew of Vithal Sundar himself, the other lieutenants being Narsinha Dixit Kaygaonkar whose father was killed in one of battle in Bundelkhand fighting for Marathas, Shankarji Joshi and Krishnarao Kanitkar.

The latter 3 were given Jagirs of Kaygaon Toke, Badnapur and Limbaganesh whilst Vinayak Dasrao was given Inam of Neuregaon. Vithal Sundar was given Jagir of the most fertile area of Pimpri in Aurangabad District. Amongst these, Krishnarao Kanitkar had given refuge to Vyankatrao Ghorpade of Ichalkaranji, Sardar Kolhatkar of Pen (Brother-in-law of Sadashivrao Peshwa) and Sardar Hariba Patwardhan of Sangli during their flight from Scindia's forces during the mutiny of the pretender of Sadashiv Bhau. This refuge was given at the request of Sardar Tukoji Holkar.

Over and above the army of 25,000 of these Jagirdars from the Marathi area and loyal forces of Ismail Khan Panni, Raghoji Jadhavrao IV and Nanasaheb Nimbalkar Khardekar, Nizam was also assisted by General Bussey's French troops. However, the Marathas were being led by Peshwa Madhavrao (until the skirmish of Chambhar Gonda, Senasahebsubha Janoji Bhonsle and Raghunathrao, uncle of Peshwa were also in the camp), who was assisted by Visaji Tryambak, Sardar Naro Shankar Dani, Babuji Naik (A Chief of Senasahebsubha's Nagpur Army who, prior to battle a few months before, had made a friendship treaty with Nizam), Sardar Yashwantrao/Santajirao Wable (Kopergaon) and Sardar Malojiraje III Ghorpade of Mudhol trounced the Nizam's forces at Rakshasbhuvan after the battle was fought for five to six months. Many of Nizam's trusted dukes like Shambhulal, Hamid Ulla Khan, Laxmanrao Khandagale, Rukn Ud Doula, Ramchandrarao Jadhavrao of Bhalki, Mir Moghal Ali Khan alias Nasir Ul Mulk left Nizam after the throne was encroached by Nizam Ali, brother of dethroned Nizam Salabat Jung and joined Marathas.

Ironically Govindrao Ghorpade, who fought on behalf of the Nizam, was killed at the hands of his father, Malojirao Ghorpade, who was with Marathas. The Nizam's closest aide, Vithal Sundar, was killed by Sardar Mahadaji Shitole Deshmukh of Kasba Pune.

Truce
A truce was reached and a treaty was signed at Aurangabad, whereby the Nizam lost 50 lacs territory including Bhalki and except Telangana and the eastern part of the Godavari river in Maharashtra. They gained the Bidar and Naldurg forts in exchange for Bhalki.

As a part of the settlement, Neurgaon and Limbaganesh became part of the Maratha empire. After the defeat of Marathas in 1818, the British returned this territory to Nizam IV and these two Jagirs got merged into Nizam State.. This led to Salar Jung II advising 5th Nizam to terminate their Jagirs.

As a result, the Jagirs of Neurgaon, Badnapur and Kaygaon got merged with the Jagir of Takli/Lad Sawangi. Troops of Limbaganesh got merged with 5000 Mansab of Aamir Nawaz Khan, Talukdar of Naldurg and Collector of Bhir in 1843 which were restored by Sir Sikandar Khan's father during his reign in 1888.

This decisive victory made Marathas stronger. Surprisingly Vithal Sundar's vacant post of Diwan was given to Mir Musa Khan Rukn Ud Daula, a Peshwa lobbyist in Nizam's durbar.

See also
 Maratha Empire
 Nizam of Hyderabad

References

External links

Rakshasbhuvan
Rakshasbhuvan
Rakshasbhuvan
Conflicts in 1763
Wars involving Hyderabad
1763 in India